David Johnson is a former member of the Ohio House of Representatives.
He is also the current county chairman of the Republican party for Ohio's 6th District.

References

Republican Party members of the Ohio House of Representatives
Politicians from Cleveland
Living people
Year of birth missing (living people)